Cheney, originally de Cheney, is a toponymic surname of Old French origin, introduced into England by the Normans.

The derivation is from the Old French chesne (modern French: chêne) "oak tree" with the Old French suffix -ei / -ai meaning "collection of [trees]", so chenei  "oak grove", from Medieval Latin . The surname may be either locational or topographical in origin. As a locational name, Cheney may derive from any of the places named with the Old French , nowadays Chesney, Chesnay, le Chesnay, la Chesnaye, etc. As a topographical name, Cheney denoted residence near a conspicuous oak tree, or in an oak forest. The surname is now found widespread in Scotland, where the first known bearer of the name is William de Chesne, who witnessed a charter in 1200. The development of the name includes the following examples and may refer to:

Alfred Cheney Johnston (1885–1971), American photographer known for his portraits of Ziegfeld Follies showgirls
Amy Marcy Cheney Beach (1867–1944), first American female composer of large-scale art music
Arthur Cheney Train (1875–1945), American lawyer and writer of legal thrillers
Ben Cheney (1905–1971), lumber businessman
Benjamin Pierce Cheney (1815–1895), American businessman
Brainard Cheney (1900–1990), Georgia novelist, playwright and essayist
C. R. Cheney (1906–1987), medieval historian
Charles E. Cheney (1836–1916), Reformed Episcopal Church bishop from New York
Chris Cheney (born 1975), guitarist and lead singer of Australian rock band The Living End
Colin Cheney (born 1978), American poet
David D. Cheney (1822–1904), Wisconsin State Assembly member
David W. Cheney (1859–1913), Wisconsin State Assembly member
Dick Cheney (born 1941), 46th Vice President of the United States and former United States Representative
Dorothy Cheney (1916–2014), tennis player
Dorothy Cheney (scientist) (1950–2018), American scientist who studied the wild primates in their natural habitat
Edith C. Cheney (1888–1953), New York assemblywoman 1940–1944
Ednah Dow Littlehale Cheney (1824–1904), Boston writer, reformer and philanthropist
Captain Edward Cheney (1788-1846) led the Royal Scots Greys as temporary Brevet Colonel at the Battle of Waterloo
Edwin Cheney (1869–1942), commissioned the Frank Lloyd Wright Cheney House
Elizabeth Cheney (gentry) (1422–1473), English aristocrat
Ellen Cheney Johnson (1829–1899), American prison reformer
Elliott Ward Cheney Jr. (1929–2016), University of Texas mathematician and professor
Emily Cheney Neville (1919–1997), author and Newbury Medal winner
Eric Cheney (1924–2001), English motorcycle racer, designer and independent constructor
Flora Cheney (1872–1929), Illinois state Representative
George Edward Cheney, American educator and internationally recognized leader in the area of organizational communication
Grahame Cheney (born 1969), Australian boxer
Guy W. Cheney (1886–1939), New York politician
Hampton J. Cheney (1836–1927), American politician
Harry Morrison Cheney (1860–1937), Speaker of the New Hampshire House of Representatives
Harriet Vaughan Cheney (1796–1889), American-Canadian novelist
Herbert Cheney (1873–1931), American college football coach and educator
Horace B. Cheney (1868–1938), American administrator
Howard Lovewell Cheney (1889–1969), American architect and engineer, who designed Washington National Airport
Howell Cheney (1870–1957), American silk manufacturer
Ian Cheney, American film producer
Janice Wright Cheney, Canadian textile artist
John Cheney (disambiguation), several people
Kimberly B. Cheney (born 1935), Vermont attorney general
Kyle Cheney (footballer) (born 1989), Australian rules football player
Kyle Cheney (journalist), journalist for Politico
Larry Cheney (1886–1969), American baseball player
Lauren Cheney (born 1987), American soccer player
Liz Cheney (born 1966), United States Representative, daughter of Vice President Dick Cheney
Louis R. Cheney (1859–1944), Connecticut businessman and politician
Lynne Cheney (born 1941), wife of United States Vice President Dick Cheney
Margaret Cheney (born 1955), American mathematician
Martha Cheney (born 1953), American author
Mary Cheney (born 1969), daughter of United States Vice President Dick Cheney
Mary Moulton Cheney (1871–1957), artist and visual arts educator in Minneapolis
Mary Young Cheney Greeley (1811/1814–1872), wife of Horace Greeley
May L. Cheney (1862–1942), California educator and Appointment Secretary at University of California, Berkeley
Moses Cheney (1793–1875), abolitionist, printer and legislator from New Hampshire
Nelson W. Cheney (1875–1944), New York politician
Oren Burbank Cheney (1816–1903), abolitionist, founder of Bates College and Maine state Representative
Person Colby Cheney (1828–1901), United States Senator, Governor of New Hampshire
Peter Cheney, Canadian newspaper writer
Ray Cheney, rugby union player and sportsman from Wales
Richard Cheyney (1513–1579), bishop of Gloucester from 1562, oppositor of the Calvinism
Richard Cheney (New Mexico politician), state representative (2003–2007)
Rufus Cheney Jr., Wisconsin State Assembly member
Russell Cheney (1881–1945), American painter
Ruth Cheney Streeter (1895–1990), the first director of the United States Marine Corps Women's Reserve (USMCWR)
Seth Wells Cheney (1810–1856), American artist and pioneer of crayon work
Sheldon Warren Cheney (1886–1980), American author and critic
Sherwood Cheney (1873–1949), U.S. Army Corps of Engineers brigadier general
Stephen A. Cheney, U. S. Marine Corps brigadier general
Syl Cheney-Coker (born 1945), poet, novelist and journalist from Sierra Leone
Thomas Cheney (c. 1485 – 1558), Lord Warden of the Cinque Ports
Thomas C. Cheney (1868–1957), Vermont politician
Tom Cheney (disambiguation), several people
Ward Cheney (1813–1876), American pioneer manufacturer of silk fabrics
Yarrow Cheney, American production designer, visual effects artist, director and animator

See also
Chaney, surname
Cheaney, surname
Chesney, surname and given name
Cheyne, surname and given name
Duquesne (disambiguation)

Surnames of English origin
Surnames of Norman origin